Sophie McNeill (born 1985) is an Australian journalist, television presenter, author and human rights activist. She is best known for her work reporting from conflict zones.

She was a reporter with the ABC's investigative program Four Corners and is a former Middle East Correspondent for ABC news; and has delivered reports from across the region including in Afghanistan, Israel, Iraq, Pakistan, Syria, Yemen, Egypt, Turkey and Gaza. She resigned from the ABC in 2020 to work as a researcher for Human Rights Watch.

Life and career 
McNeill began making documentaries in 2001, her first film highlighted the crippling health crisis in a recently-liberated East Timor, for which she received Western Australia's Young Person of the Year Award.

In 2003, McNeill's investigation into the death of an asylum seeker who'd been held under Australia's mandatory detention policy won her the MEAA's Student Journalist of the Year Award, Best Newcomer at the West Australian Media Awards and Best Emerging Director at the West Australian Screen Awards.

She was also a New York Film Festival finalist for her 2005 story Shoot the Messenger, which detailed the shooting of an unarmed, wounded Iraqi in a Fallujah mosque by an American soldier.

McNeill has worked for ABC's Foreign Correspondent, SBS's Dateline and is a former host of the news and current affairs program Hack on Triple J. She has twice been awarded Australian Young TV Journalist of the Year and in 2010 won a Walkley award for her investigation into the killing of five children in Afghanistan by Australian Special Forces soldiers, and was nominated for a Walkley in 2015 for her coverage of the Syrian refugee crisis. In September 2015, her reporting helped reunite a Syrian refugee family that had become separated on the European refugee trail.

In 2019, she received international recognition for her efforts documenting the asylum claim of Rahaf Mohammed.

In March 2020, ABC Books published McNeill's first book, We Can't Say We Didn't Know: Dispatches from an age of impunity. It was shortlisted for the 2020 Walkley Book Award and for the Premier's Prize for an Emerging Writer at the 2020 Western Australian Premier's Book Awards.

References

Australian journalists
Living people
1985 births